Julie Morrison (born Julie Hepburn 21 May 1968) is a former Scottish junior and Hong Kong women's curler.  As a junior she won a bronze medal at the 1989 World Junior Curling Championships.

Teams

Scotland

Hong Kong

References

External links
 

Living people
Scottish female curlers
Hong Kong female curlers
1968 births
Curling coaches
Scottish emigrants to Hong Kong
Place of birth missing (living people)